

Denewulf (died 908) was a medieval Bishop of Winchester from 878 or 879 until his death. Little is known of him, though by tradition he began life as a swineherd, and was promoted to bishop at an advanced age after a chance encounter with Alfred the Great.

Life and tradition
Denewulf was consecrated as Bishop of Winchester between 878 and 879. He died in 908. Chroniclers beginning with John of Worcester in the 12th century recorded a tradition that Denewulf was originally an illiterate swineherd who had a chance encounter with King Alfred the Great. According to these versions, Alfred was taking refuge from the Danes in the forest where Denewulf was feeding his pigs. He was so impressed with the elderly swineherd's character that he sponsored his education and had elevated him to bishop.  

Denuwulf's name subsequently became attached to an older story regarding Alfred's encounter with a swineherd. According to this story, first recorded in the tenth-century Life of Neot, Alfred stayed with a swineherd and his wife for several days while fleeing the Danes. One day, the wife berated him for not turning her cakes on the stove when they began to burn; the humbled king subsequently helped her with the baking. This swineherd was identified as Denewulf in John Hardyng's verse chronicle, first published in 1543; in this version Alfred made Denewulf bishop following his wife's death. The story of Alfred and the cakes was often repeated as an example of the suffering the king endured for his realm; modern retellings usually play up the humorous aspect.

Citations

References
 
 John of Worcester Chronicle, ed. R. R. Darlington and P. McGurk, trans. Jennifer Bray and P. McGurk. Oxford: Clarendon Press 1995.

External links
 

Bishops of Winchester
9th-century births
908 deaths

9th-century English bishops
10th-century English bishops
Year of birth unknown